Daniela Torres Huerta (born 23 July 1994) is a Mexican long-distance runner. She qualified to represent Mexico at the 2020 Summer Olympics in Tokyo 2021, competing in women's marathon.

References

External links
 

1994 births
Living people
Mexican female long-distance runners
Athletes (track and field) at the 2020 Summer Olympics
Olympic athletes of Mexico
21st-century Mexican women